No Rain, No Rose is the fifth studio album by folk singer-songwriter John Craigie. It was released on January 27, 2017, and recorded in his living room in Portland, Oregon, with the help of other well-known musicians around Portland such as the Shook Twins and Gregory Alan Isakov. This album describes John Craigie's life as a traveling musician and explores the sense of home that he found in Portland after moving from Los Angeles.

The comical banter heard within the tracks demonstrate some of the album's influence from Nitty Gritty Dirt Band's 1972 album Will the Circle be Unbroken. Other influences include The Rolling Stones with the album's folksy cover of "Tumbling Dice".

The title of the album comes from the old Buddhist saying "No mud, no lotus", meaning bad things are necessary in order for good things to happen. John Craigie captures this sentiment throughout the album, and since Portland is the "City of Roses", he symbolizes his hometown as the lotus from the saying, or in other words, one of the 'good things' that has come from hard times.

Track listing

Personnel
John Craigie – acoustic guitar, vocals, harmonica, percussion, producer
Tyler Thompson – drums, percussion, banjo, vocals
Justin Landis – electric guitar, electric bass, drums on Tumbling Dice
Brad "Twinkle Toes" Parsons – piano, vocals, percussion
Kat Fountain – vocals
Bevin Foley – violin, fiddle, vocals
Jay Cobb Anderson – electric guitar, vocals, percussion
Niko Daoussis – mandolin, electric guitar, vocals, percussion
Shook Twins – vocals
Gregory Alan Isakov – vocals
Bart Budwig – vocals, percussion, audio engineer
John Nuhn – upright bass, vocals, percussion
Will Koster – dobro

Production
John Craigie – producer
Bart Budwig – engineering and mixing
Adam Gonsalves – mastering

References

John Craigie (musician) albums
2017 albums